William MacLeod Newman (June 15, 1934 – May 27, 2015) was an American film, television and theater actor. His professional credits include Mrs. Doubtfire in 1993.

Biography
Newman was born in Chicago, Illinois, on June 15, 1934. He moved to Seattle, Washington, with his family in 1937. Newman graduated from Roosevelt High School in Seattle in 1952 and received a bachelor's degree from the University of Washington in 1956. He was the recipient of a Woodrow Wilson Fellowship, which allowed Newman to study advanced writing at Columbia University from 1958 to 1960. Newman also served in the U.S. Armed Forces during the late 1950s and early 1960s.
Newman married the former Julia Tayon circa 1960. He later married Margaret Ramsey. He had three children: Liam, Katherine, and Matthew, who died in a fall in 1976. Newman became a Quaker in 1989.
In 1965, Newman was hired as an actor at the Seattle Repertory Theatre. He acted at various theater companies throughout the country during his career, including the Baltimore Center Stage, the Minneapolis Guthrie Theater, the Denver Center Theater, and The Repertory Theatre of St. Louis. He also served as an artist-in-residence at Stephens College in Columbia, Missouri.

Newman also appeared in numerous film and television roles. His film credits included Brubaker (1980), The Postman Always Rings Twice (1981), Silver Bullet (1985), Act of Vengeance (1986), Playing for Keeps (1986), The Mosquito Coast (1986), Funny Farm (1988), Monkey Shines (1988), Hero (1992), Leprechaun (1993), The Stand (1994), Jury Duty (1995), Tom and Huck (1995), The Craft (1996), Santa with Muscles (1996), Brown's Requiem (1998), For Love of the Game (1999) and Teacher's Pet (2000). Newman also appeared in Mrs. Doubtfire (1993), opposite Robin Williams and Sally Field.

In 1991, Newman was cast as Kalin Trose in the Star Trek: The Next Generation episode, The Host. His last television credit was an episode of My Name Is Earl in 2006.

Newman died from vascular dementia at the Hayes Manor Retirement Residence in Philadelphia, Pennsylvania, on May 27, 2015, at the age of 80.

Filmography

References

External links

1934 births
2015 deaths
American male film actors
American male television actors
American male stage actors
American Quakers
University of Washington alumni
Columbia University School of the Arts alumni
Male actors from Seattle
Male actors from Chicago
People from Ardmore, Pennsylvania
Deaths from dementia in Pennsylvania
Deaths from vascular dementia